Verduron may refer to:

Places
Verduron, Marseille, a neighbourhood of Marseille, France.
Oppidum de Verduron, an oppidum in Marseille, France.
Canton of Marseille-Verduron, a former territorial subdivision in Marseille, France.
Château du Verduron, a historic château near Paris, France.